Béla Komjádi (15 March 1892 – 5 March 1933; known as Béla Bácsi (Uncle Béla) by his players) was a Hungarian water polo player and coach.

Early life
He was Jewish, and was born in Budapest, Hungary.

Water polo coaching career
He helped Hungary form the men's national water polo team, including the non-medaling Olympic teams of 1912 and 1924, and the European Championship teams of 1926, 1927, and 1931, all of which won gold medals.

He died in 1933, while playing water polo, at the age of 41.

In 1976, a new Olympic swimming pool on the Buda bank in Budapest was named the Bela Komjadi Pool, after him.

Halls of Fame
He was inducted into the International Swimming Hall of Fame, and the International Jewish Sports Hall of Fame.

See also
 List of members of the International Swimming Hall of Fame

References

1892 births
1933 deaths
Hungarian male water polo players
Hungarian Jews
Hungarian water polo coaches
Jewish water polo players
Water polo players from Budapest
19th-century Hungarian people
20th-century Hungarian people